Ruciane-Nida  is a town in Pisz County, Warmian-Masurian Voivodeship, Poland. The town was formed in 1966 by the merger of three smaller settlements: Ruciane (renamed Niedersee in 1938), Nida (German: Nieden) and Wola Ratajowa. It is located within the historic region of Masuria.

The town of Ruciane-Nida is a well-known tourist centre within the Masurian Lake District, with a popular railway line running through it: a D29-219 line – Olsztyn – Szczytno – Świętajno – Pisz – Ełk. In the summer, it becomes the furthermost Southern station of the Masurian Recreational Navigation system.

As of 2004, the town had a population of 4,934.

Sights 
 Guzianka Lock, Nida Canal
 Our Lady of Mercy church (Kościół Matki Bożej Miłosierdzia Ostrobramskiej) from 1910 (in Ruciane)
 Historical seed extraction plant from late 19th century
 Military bunkers from before the World Wars, early 20th century
 Nature monuments: pine, oak

See also 
 Puszcza Piska
 Masuria

References 

 Official town webpage
  Biuletyn Informacji Publicznej Urzędu Miasta i Gminy

Cities and towns in Warmian-Masurian Voivodeship
Pisz County

it:Ruciane-Nida